Harry Michael (born February 12, 1991), known professionally as Masked Wolf, is an Australian rapper and singer from Sydney, New South Wales. He is best known for his song "Astronaut in the Ocean", which became a sleeper hit in 2021, peaking at number 4 on the Australian ARIA Charts and number 6 on the US Billboard Hot 100, having been initially released in June 2019.

Early life
In an interview in 2019, Michael said, "I've always been interested in music and as a young kid, my musical outlet was actually playing instruments like the piano, keyboard, guitar and drums." He is a "huge fan" of American hip hop and Latest Naija Songs  He began writing at the age of 13.

Career
Michael signed to Teamwrk Records and released his debut single "Speed Racer" in December 2018. All of his subsequent releases were on the label, up until 2021, when "Astronaut in the Ocean" was re-released.

On 28 January 2021, Michael signed to US-based label Elektra Records, owned by Warner Music Group, in a multi-album deal. Elektra represent Michael's music in all regions except Australia and New Zealand, where he continues to be represented by Teamwrk Records. In a statement, Michael said: "I'm so happy to be a part of the Elektra family, I am really excited to be able to have the opportunity for the world to now hear my music... not only do they develop artists, but they care about each song and that's why I wanted to join them." On 4 June, Michael released the single "Gravity Glidin". The following week, "Gravity Glidin" debuted and peaked at number 40 on the NZ Hot Singles Chart for the chart dated 13 June. On 8 July, Michael released the single "Say So". The following week, "Say So" debuted and peaked at number twenty on the NZ Hot Singles Chart for the chart dated 18 July. On 21 July, Michael was announced for having the highest listener growth on Spotify in the first half of the year, which saw more than 27 million new listeners. On 24 July, Michael performed at the Splendour in the Grass virtual festival Splendour XR. On 4 September, Michael announced his debut mixtape, Astrononomical, and released the single "Razor's Edge", which features X Ambassadors. Astronomical was released on 10 September.

On 19 November 2021, Masked Wolf released "It's You, Not Me (Sabotage)" with Bebe Rexha; a reimagined version of Rexha's own "Sabotage".

Discography

Mixtapes

Singles

As lead artist

As featured artist

Notes

Awards and nominations

APRA Awards
The APRA Awards are held in Australia and New Zealand by the Australasian Performing Right Association to recognise songwriting skills, sales and airplay performance by its members annually.

! 
|-
| 2022
| Tyon Hapy & Harry Michael (Masked Wolf)
| Breakthrough Songwriter of the Year
| 
| 
|-

ARIA Music Awards
The ARIA Music Awards is an annual ceremony presented by Australian Recording Industry Association (ARIA), which recognise excellence, innovation, and achievement across all genres of the music of Australia. They commenced in 1987.

! 
|-
| rowspan="5"| 2021||rowspan="4"| "Astronaut in the Ocean" || Best Artist || 
| rowspan="5"| 
|-
| Breakthrough Artist ||  
|-
| Best Hip Hop Release ||  
|-
| Song of the Year ||  
|-
| Daniele Cernera for "Astronaut in the Ocean" || Best Video || 
|-

Rolling Stone Australia Awards
The Rolling Stone Australia Awards are awarded annually in January or February by the Australian edition of Rolling Stone magazine for outstanding contributions to popular culture in the previous year.

! 
|-
|rowspan="2"| 2022
| Masked Wolf
| Best New Artist
| 
|rowspan="2"|
|-
| Masked Wolf
| Rolling Stone Global Award
|

References

External links

 
 

1992 births
Australian male rappers
Rappers from Sydney
Australian people of Greek descent
Elektra Records artists
Living people